This is a list of political parties in Ukraine, both past and present. As of January 1, 2020, there are 349 officially registered political parties in Ukraine.

Active

Parties represented in the Verkhovna Rada

Official factions
Political parties in Ukraine need to hold at least fifteen seats in parliament in order to be recognized as official parliamentary factions.

Parliamentary groups
In the Verkhovna Rada, parliamentary groups are formed by deputies during a session of parliament. Usually, parliamentary groups are made up of independent deputies or deputies from parties that did not gain enough seats in parliament to form an official faction. Sometimes, they can also be formed through the splintering of official factions. Two parties in the current session of parliament, For the Future and Dovira, were originally formed as parliamentary groups after the 2019 Ukrainian parliamentary election but later expanded into full-fledged political parties.

Parties without faction status
Because of the use of first-past-the-post single-mandate electoral districts in Ukrainian parliamentary elections, it is possible for a political party to get fewer than fifteen seats in parliament, meaning that it is not recognized as an official faction. While these deputies were elected as representatives of their respective parties, and continue to be affiliated with their political parties during their time in office, they officially sit as independents. Often, they join parliamentary groups in order to gain more influence over the legislative process (while maintaining their affiliation to their original party).

Parties represented in Oblast Councils
Ukraine is made up of 24 oblasts, as well as two cities with special status (Kyiv and Sevastopol) and one autonomous republic (the Autonomous Republic of Crimea). All of these entities have oblast Councils (or city councils in the case of Kyiv and Sevastopol), which function as regional legislatures, and are the second level of government after the Verkhovna Rada. In total, there are 1,780 seats across all oblast Councils in Ukraine. These parties have representation on at least one oblast Councils, but no seats in parliament.

Parties with local representation
These political parties have no seats in parliament or any regional legislature, but do have local representation on city or town councils, mayorships, or other municipal bodies. Many of these parties are local organizations and operate only in a specific city or oblast.

Other parties
Currently active political parties in Ukraine with no seats in parliament nor in Oblast Councils.

Defunct

Banned parties

On 20 March 2022, in the midst of the 2022 Russian invasion of Ukraine, president of Ukraine Volodymyr Zelenskyy announced the suspension of eleven political parties with ties to Russia, which would last until the end of martial law in Ukraine. Two of the suspended political parties, Opposition Platform — For Life and Opposition Bloc, have a significant presence in national politics, while the remaining nine parties are marginal.
In June 2022 various court proceedings tried to ban the parties suspended on 20 March 2022. Of all the  parties suspended on 20 March 2022 only the Progressive Socialist Party of Ukraine and Opposition Platform — For Life actively opposed its banning. In September 2022 the final appeals against the parties' ban were dismissed by the Supreme Court of Ukraine, meaning that the parties were fully banned in Ukraine.

Former parliamentary parties

A faction of nonpartisan deputies under the name Reforms for the Future existed between 16 February 2011 and 15 December 2012. A faction of nonpartisan deputies under the name For Peace and Stability existed between 2 July 2014 and 27 November 2014. From 1998 to 2000, there was another parliamentary faction Labour Ukraine that existed without its political party until it was registered by the Ukrainian Ministry of Justice in June 2000.

The Communist Party of Ukraine (Soviet Union) was prohibited in 1991, however its members were not excluded from the Ukrainian parliament. They formed a parliamentary faction of the Socialist Party of Ukraine. For the 1994 parliamentary elections however the ban on communist parties was lifted and there were two parties with similar ideologies running for parliament the Socialist Party of Ukraine and the Communist Party of Ukraine that was reestablished in 1993.

Other defunct political parties
List of defunct political parties by founding year:
All-Ukrainian Political Movement "State Independence of Ukraine" (1990-2003)
Ukrainian Beer Lovers Party (1991–1997)
Party of Economic Revival (1992-2003)
Republican Party of Crimea (1992-1995)
Party of Regions (1997-2014)

Party mergers
Party of Democratic Revival of Ukraine (1990-1996), merged with People's Democratic Party in 1996.
Toiling Congress of Ukraine (1993-1996), merged with People's Democratic Party in 1996.
Union of Support for Republic of Crimea, merged with People's Democratic Party in 1996.
Party of Labor (1992-2000), merged with the Party of Regions in 2000.
Ukrainian Conservative Republican Party (1992-2001), merged with the All-Ukrainian Union "Fatherland" in 2001.
Ukrainian People's Party "Sobor", merged with the Ukrainian Republican Party "Sobor" in 2002.
People's Power (2004-2011), merged with the United Left and Peasants in 2011.
Rural Revival Party (1993-2011), merged with the United Left and Peasants in 2011.
Ukrainian Peasant Democratic Party (1991-2011), merged with United Left and Peasants in 2011.
Front for Change (2007-2013), merged with the All-Ukrainian Union "Fatherland" in 2013.
Reforms and Order Party (1997-2013), merged with the All-Ukrainian Union "Fatherland" in 2013.
Ukrainian National Assembly (1994-2014), merged with the Right Sector in 2014.

Defunct political alliances and blocs (1998–2012)
The idea of electoral blocs as a loose association of parties was introduced in 1998, however it did not become popular right away. The real success of electoral blocks came in 2002 when the Bloc of Victor Yushchenko "Our Ukraine" gained the most parliamentary seats. The electoral blocs system was liquidated in 2011 forcing registration of individual parties for the next 2012 parliamentary elections. The longest existing political blocs were Our Ukraine and Bloc of Yulia Tymoshenko.

The association of parties however was transformed into a new concept of an "umbrella party" when several parties temporarily unite under such party that becomes a core party of informal electoral bloc. Below is the list of official electoral blocs in 1998 - 2012 that led to creation of their own parliamentary factions.

Bloc of SPU-SelPU (1998–2002)
Our Ukraine (2002–2012; Bloc of Viktor Yushchenko, Our Ukraine-People's Self-Defense Bloc)
For United Ukraine (2002–2006)
Bloc of Yulia Tymoshenko (2002–2012)
Bloc of Volodymyr Lytvyn (2007–2012)

Minor blocs
The following blocs did not form their parliamentary factions due to small number of their representatives.
 Party of Labor - Liberal Party of Ukraine
 Bloc of Democratic Parties NEP
 Social Liberal Union SLOn
 Fewer Words
 Unity
 Democratic Party of Ukraine - Democratic Union

Kyiv Oblast/City
Leonid Chernovetskyi Bloc (Disbanded itself on September 22, 2011)
Christian Liberal Party of Ukraine
Christian Democratic Union

Crimea
For Yanukovych! (associated with Party of Regions; (only) participated in the 2006 Crimean parliamentary election)
Solidarity (associated with Social Democratic Party of Ukraine (united))
Krym

Ukrainian parties prior to 1991

Russian Empire
Ukrainian Social Democratic Labour Party (1905-1950, Social democracy)
Ukrainian Socialist Revolutionary Party (1917-1918, Socialism)

Ukrainian People's Republic (1917-1921)
Ukrainian Social Democratic Labour Party (1905-1950, Social democracy)
Ukrainian Socialist Revolutionary Party (1917-1918, Socialism)
Ukrainian Communist Party (1920-1925, Marxism)
Borotbists (1918-1920, Left-wing nationalism)

Ukrainian Soviet Socialist Republic (1918-1991)
Communist Party of Ukraine (Soviet Union) (1918-1991)

See also
 List of political parties by country

Notes

References

External links

Parties List on the Electoral Memory UKR.VOTE
Official databases of political parties in Ukraine of the Ukrainian Ministry of Justice 
Databases DA-TA: Political parties in Ukraine 
Databases ASD: Political parties in Ukraine 

Ukraine

Political parties
Ukraine
Political parties